Dwight D. Eisenhower High School (est. 1959), is located in Rialto, California, United States on the corner of Baseline Avenue and Lilac Ave.  The school is named for U.S. President Dwight D. Eisenhower.

Eisenhower High School is located in Rialto, California, which lies north of Interstate 10, between the cities of San Bernardino and Fontana. It is one of three comprehensive high schools in the Rialto Unified School District and serves a student population of approximately 2,400 in grades 9–12. Established in 1959.

Dwight D. Eisenhower High School has been awarded National Blue Ribbon School 1993 and California Distinguished School 1994.

Notable alumni 

 Alex Acker, NBA player for the Clippers 
 Wally Adeyemo, United States Deputy Secretary of the Treasury in the Biden Administration (2021—)
 Brandie Burton, LPGA golfer
 Victor Butler, a 2005 graduate, member of the Dallas Cowboys and played college at the Oregon State University.
 Ted Chronopoulos, Major League Soccer player
 Ryan Clady, a 2004 graduate, is the starting left tackle for the Denver Broncos of the National Football League, and was their 1st Round Draft Choice in the 2008 NFL Draft.
 Darnell Coles, Seattle Mariners and Detroit Tigers 
 Jeff Conine, retired MLB player
 Bob Rauch, former MLB pitcher for New York Mets
 Wilson Cruz, 1991 Graduate, Actor, LGBT Activist
 Kirk Fogg, 1977 graduate, actor and game show host
 Clarence Gilyard, actor (Matlock and Walker, Texas Ranger)
 David Lang, 1986 graduate, drafted in the 12th round of the 1990 NFL Draft to the Northern Arizona University, in 1992 he spent four years with the Los Angeles Rams and in 1995 he was the special teams captain of the Super Bowl XXX-winning Dallas Cowboys.
 Ronnie Lott, NFL Hall of Fame
 Sean Marshall (basketball) 13 year pro basketball player
Rowayne Schatz, Major General USAF ret.
 Dave Rucker, former MLB pitcher
 Vanessa Rumbles, 2003 graduate, Emmy-winning television news producer
 John Singleton, film director, screenwriter, producer
 R. Jay Soward, 1992–1995 student, former National Football League and USC Trojans football
 Nick Theodorou, former professional baseball player; member of 2004 Greece Olympic Baseball Team
 Lisa Marie Varon, professional wrestler

References

External links 
The official Eisenhower website: http://ehs.rialto.k12.ca.us
The Eisenhower Alumni Website, EHSGrads: http://www.ehsgrads.org contains an alumni database, a memorial page, scans of yearbooks and other alumni items.)

High schools in San Bernardino County, California
Public high schools in California
Rialto, California
1959 establishments in California
Educational institutions established in 1959